is a visual novel released for the PC by âge. It is a prequel of sorts to Muv-Luv and side story to Kimi ga Nozomu Eien, and features Akane Suzumiya from Kimi ga Nozomu Eien as its main heroine. Like Muv-Luv Extra and unlike Kimi ga Nozomu Eien, it focuses more on comedy than drama.

The game starts several weeks after the end of Kimi ga Nozomu Eien and ends a day before Muv-Luv Extra starts. Most of the main characters from Muv-Luv can be seen in the game. It was originally released in parts with Tech GIAN without voice acting, but was later released as a game with full voice acting for members of âge's official fanclub.

There is also a three episode OVA roughly based on the game, with the first DVD released on November 25, 2004. The series was animated by Silver. Many characters in the game parody Tekkaman and Tekkaman Blade. The OVA mainly parodies robot shows such as Mazinger Z. Akane Maniax marked the first appearance of Gouda Jouji, who would later become a recurring gag character in âge's games.

Plot
Jouji Gouda is a new transfer student at Hakuryo High School. On his first day of class, he fell in love at first sight for Akane Suzumiya and boldly proposed to her on the spot. The two characters conflict with each other greatly, but Jouji never gives up and would do anything to express his love towards Akane. Although his attempts to win Akane's love at first do nothing but anger Akane, he gradually starts to make an impression on her, inspiring Akane to be more honest about her own feelings.

There are two possible endings. In the good ending, Akane admits she might have developed feelings for Jouji—but confesses that she might be using him as a rebound guy since he reminds her of her sister's ex-boyfriend. He then finds a new true love in the form of Muv-Luv'''s Sumika, only to have his heart broken about a minute later when she goes running after Takeru. In the true ending, Jouji transforms into a hero called Dimension Knight Tekkumen (時空の騎士テックメン, "Jikuu no Kishi Tekkumen") and fights aliens. Either way, he is said to have transferred out of the school after being scouted for a baseball team in Muv-Luv Extra, which Kouzuki suggests might have been Meiya's doing.

In the ending of the later produced Akane Maniax OVA, Akane told Jouji that she has been accepted by an American university and will go there to further her studies. She still said it was nice to have met him. Later, after seeing Sumika running to Takeru, Jouji was taken away by Meiya and Tsukoyomi in their long limousine, presumably arranged to get some compensation and transfer to another school as a result.

Characters

The main character of Akane Maniax. After being kicked out of his last school's baseball club, he transfers to Hakuryou with the intention of getting to the Koshien, paying no heed to the fact that he is a third-year student (i.e., he would never have another chance). He has a tendency to lose himself in his imagination, and is a bit of an idiot. He grows infatuated with Akane at first sight, and does whatever he can to get her attention. His character is a parody of Minami Jouji from Uchuu no Kishi Tekkaman, and in one of the endings he transforms into a parody of Tekkaman named Jikuu no Kishi Tekkumen. He first joins class 3-D, but is later dumped into class 3-B.

From Kimi ga Nozomu Eien. The main heroine. In Akane Maniax, she starts off with the personality she had in Kimi ga Nozomu Eien, but gradually softens up to become the Akane seen in Muv-Luv. Student in class 3-D.

A gym teacher sporting a yellow afro who is actually an alien. Has a mutant living in his afro. Based on Andlau (also pronounced Andorō) Umeda from Tekkaman. Only seen in the game.

 A Hakuryou student who looks like a fat nerd, but is in fact the robot Takesu. Student in class 3-D. Only seen in the game.

From Muv-Luv. Akane's friend and rival. Student of class 3-B.

From Muv-Luv. Class 3-D's form teacher.

From Muv-Luv. Class 3-B's form teacher.

From Muv-Luv. Student in class 3-B. Jouji calls her "Psychic Gal".

From Muv-Luv. Student in class 3-B. Jouji calls her "Ambassador of the Animal Kingdom".

From Muv-Luv. Student in class 3-B. Jouji calls him "Gaia's Messenger", or sometimes just Gaia. They seem to get along pretty well, but it does not take very long for Mikoto to forget who he is after he transfers out (in Muv-Luv Extra).Muv-Luv's main heroine. Student in class 3-B.

The protagonist of Muv-Luv. Student in class 3-B.

From Kimi ga Nozomu Eien. Akane's older sister. Only seen in the OVA.

From Muv-Luv. Only seen in the OVA.

From Muv-Luv. Only seen in the OVA.

Jouji after transforming via Tekku Setup. Looks like a cross between Tekkaman and a Gyan.

Takeo's true form, that of a robot. Based on Pegasu from Tekkaman Blade''.  Looks like a cross between Pegasu and a Zaku II. Serves as a mount for Tekkumen.

Episodes

Music

References

External links
Visual novel official website 
OVA official website 

2002 video games
2004 anime OVAs
Visual novels
Mecha anime and manga
Japan-exclusive video games
Video games developed in Japan
Windows games
Windows-only games